The following is a list of Radio Disney Music Award winners and nominees for Best New Artist.

Winners and nominees

2000s

2010s

References

New Artist
Music awards for breakthrough artist